The Buddha sometimes described the practice (patipatti) of his teaching as the gradual training (Pali: anupubbasikkhā) because the Noble Eightfold Path involves a process of mind-body transformation that unfolds over a sometimes lengthy period.

The emphasis on gradual training may be understood by the fact that just as the human habits which give rise to suffering have been built up over a long period of time those same habits similarly take a long time to undo requiring a sustained effort achievable only with a genuine commitment to training.

See also
 Three Refuges
 Five Precepts
 Eight Precepts
 Four Noble Truths
 Noble Eightfold Path
 Threefold Training
 Sacca-kiriya
 Pariyatti
 Anupubbikathā
 Mangala Sutta
 Samaññaphala Sutta

Notes

Bibliography
 Bullitt, John T. (2005). Dhamma. Retrieved 2007-11-08 from "Access to Insight" at http://www.accesstoinsight.org/ptf/dhamma/index.html.
 , Bhikkhu (trans.) & Bodhi, Bhikkhu (ed.) (2001). The Middle-Length Discourses of the Buddha: A Translation of the Majjhima Nikāya. Boston: Wisdom Publications. .
 Nyanatiloka (1980). Buddhist Dictionary: Manual of Buddhist Terms and Doctrines. Kandy, Sri Lanka: Buddhist Publication Society. . Retrieved 2007-11-10 from "BuddhaSasana" at http://www.budsas.org/ebud/bud-dict/dic_idx.htm.
 Thanissaro Bhikkhu (trans.) (1998). Kutthi Sutta: The Leper (Ud. 5.3). Retrieved 2007-11-12 from "Access to Insight" at http://www.accesstoinsight.org/tipitaka/kn/ud/ud.5.03.than.html.
 Walshe, Maurice (1995). The Long Discourses of the Buddha: A Translation of the Dīgha Nikāya. Boston: Wisdom Publications. .

External links

"The Factors of the Gradual Training As Found in Various Suttas" table by Leigh Brasington 

Theravada